The name Koppu has been used for three tropical cyclones in the northwestern Pacific Ocean. The name was contributed by Japan, and means 'cup'.

 Typhoon Koppu (2003) (T0316, 17W, Sikat)
 Typhoon Koppu (2009) (T0915, 16W, Nando) – struck China.
 Typhoon Koppu (2015) (T1525, 24W, Lando) – struck Philippines as a strong typhoon.

The name Koppu was retired by the WMO Typhoon Committee in 2016 and was replaced with the name Koguma, The name was contributed by Japan and is the Japanese name of the constellation Ursa Minor.

Pacific typhoon set index articles